Point Pleasant Beach is a train station located in Point Pleasant Beach, in Ocean County, New Jersey, United States, on NJ Transit's North Jersey Coast Line, and is one of the most significant stops on the NJCL portion between Long Branch and Bay Head. This station is located on one of the borough's major arteries, Arnold Avenue, Route 35, several blocks from the Atlantic Ocean, boardwalk, Manasquan Inlet marina, and within the community's downtown business, shopping, dining and entertainment nexus. The current building and platforms are approximately 10 years old, a consequence of the station's redevelopment yielding the modern fixtures and services. The station is handicapped-accessible.

History 
Service at Point Pleasant Beach began on July 29, 1880 as part of the New York and Long Branch Railroad extension from Manasquan station. The former station depot constructed by the Central Railroad of New Jersey was razed after being condemned due to the station settling to the ground. The 50-year-old structure was demolished on June 8, 1987, and replaced by a trailer. After several delays, construction of the new station began in June 1994, ultimately opening in January 1996.

Station layout
The station features an enclosed ticketing/waiting area building adjoined to the inbound tracks. The southbound platform features some overhangs for protection from the elements but no major structures or services since the majority of people using this platform are inbound from the north due to there being only one more southerly stop. NJ Transit buses are frequently waiting adjacent to the southbound platform for connecting service for passengers arriving from stations northwards. The Point Pleasant Beach station features a fairly spacious parking lot adjoining the station building and northbound platform. Northbound trains serve track 1 and southbounds on track 2.

References

External links

 Station from Google Maps Street View

NJ Transit Rail Operations stations
Railway stations in Ocean County, New Jersey
Stations on the North Jersey Coast Line
Former New York and Long Branch Railroad stations
Railway stations in the United States opened in 1880
1880 establishments in New Jersey